The 1982 Brent Council election took place on 6 May 1982 to elect members of Brent London Borough Council in London, England. The whole council was up for election and the council went in no overall control.

Background

Election result

Ward results

References

1982
1982 London Borough council elections
May 1982 events in the United Kingdom